Hamal Lake is situated in Qambar Shahdadkot District in Sindh, Pakistan, 58 km from Larkana city and 40 km from Qambar town. The length of the lake is 25 km and the width is 10 km and has a surface area of 2965 acres (1200 ha).
It is a fresh water lake and the main source of water are the streams comes through from Kirthar Mountains.

Hamal Lake is the habitat of resident and Siberian migratory birds like Ducks, Geese, Coots, Shorebirds, Cormorants,  Flamingos, Herons, Ibises, Gulls, Terns and Egrets. It is also the great nursery of fresh water fishes. But now environment and wildlife of this lake is badly affected by discharging of poisonous and saline water of the Hirdin drain.

See also
Haleji Lake
Hadero Lake

References

Lakes of Sindh
Qambar Shahdadkot District